Casini is an Italian surname. Notable people with the surname include:

Angela Casini, medicinal and inorganic chemist
Barbara Casini (born 1954), Italian vocalist and guitar player 
Carlo Casini (1935–2020), Italian politician
Giovanni Casini (1689–1748), Italian portraitist
Giovanni Maria Casini (1652-1719), Italian composer
Giuseppina Casini, known as Pina Cei (1904–2000), Italian stage, film and television actress
Italo Casini (1892–date of death unknown), Italian bobsledder
Maria Teresa Casini (1864–1937), Italian nun, founder of the Oblate Sisters of the Sacred Heart of Jesus
Pier Ferdinando Casini (born 1955), Italian politician
Riccardo Casini (born 1992), Italian footballer
Stefania Casini (born 1948), Italian actress
Valore and Domenico Casini, two brothers, both Italian painters

See also 
 Cassini (disambiguation) 

Italian-language surnames